See also the 166 Inter GT car
See also the 166 MM Berlinetta Le Mans
See also the Ferrari-Abarth 166 MM/53

The Ferrari 166 S was a sports racing car built by Ferrari between 1948 and 1953, an evolution of its Colombo V12-powered 125 S racer.  It was adapted into a sports car for the street in the form of the 166 Inter. 

Only 12 Ferrari 166 S were produced, nine of them with cycle-fenders as the Spyder Corsa.  It was soon followed by the updated and highly successful Ferrari 166 MM (Mille Miglia), of which 47 were made from 1948 to 1953. Its early victories in the Targa Florio and Mille Miglia and others in international competition made the manufacturer a serious competitor in the racing industry. Both were later replaced by the 2.3 L 195 S.

Design
The 166 shared its Aurelio Lampredi-designed tube frame and double wishbone/live axle suspension with the 125. Like the 125, the wheelbase was 2420 mm long. Nine 166 Spyder Corsas and three 166 Sports were built. The first two 166 S models were coachbuilt by Carrozzeria Allemano and the last one by Carlo Anderloni at Carrozzeria Touring. Majority of the 166 MM cars were bodied at Touring in a barchetta form.

The 1.5 L Gioacchino Colombo-designed V12 engine of the 125 was changed, however, with single overhead camshafts specified and a larger 2.0 L (1995 cc/121 in³) displacement. This was achieved with both a bore and stroke increase, to 60 by 58.8 mm respectively.

Motor Trend Classic named the 166 MM Barchetta as number six in their list of the ten "Greatest Ferraris of all time".

Racing
The Ferrari 166 S won Targa Florio with Clemente Biondetti and Igor Troubetzkoy in 1948. In 1949, Biondetti also won in the 166 SC with Benedetti as co-driver. The 166 S won 1948 Mille Miglia, also driven by Biondetti, this time with Giuseppe Navone. In 1949 Mille Miglia, the Ferrari 166 MM Barchettas scored 1-2 victory with Biondetti/Salani and Bonetto/Carpani respectively. In 1949, the 166 MM also won the 24 Hours of Le Mans in the hands of Luigi Chinetti and Lord Selsdon, and so the 
166 was the only car ever to win all three races. The another 166 won the 1949 Spa 24 Hours.

A 166 chassis, this time with the bigger 195 S engine, won the Mille Miglia again in 1950 with drivers Giannino Marzotto and Marco Crosara.

Surviving examples
The oldest Ferrari car with an undisputed pedigree is s/n 002C, a 166 Spider Corsa which was originally a 159 and is currently owned and driven by James Glickenhaus.  S/n 0052M, a 1950 166 MM Touring Barchetta was uncovered in a barn and was shown in public for the first time since 1959 in the August 2006 issue of Cavallino magazine. One 166 MM, 1949 s/n 0018M, was bodied by Zagato in 'Panoramica' style, very similar to their one-off Maserati A6 1500, also designed by Vieri Rapi. It is considered as first Ferrari coachbuilt by Zagato. A year later it was rebodied as Zagato Spyder. Currently Zagato offers Sanction Lost programme to bring lost designs back to life. The aforementioned car was recreated in 2007.

Gallery

References

Bibliography

External links

Ferrari 166 Inter Sport: Ferrari History
Ferrari 166 MM: Ferrari History

24 Hours of Le Mans race cars
Le Mans winning cars
166 S
Mille Miglia
Rear-wheel-drive vehicles
Winner